Rudbar-e Edru (also Romanized as Rūdbār-e Edrū; also known as Rūdbār) is a village in Chahardangeh Rural District, Chahardangeh District, Sari County, Mazandaran Province, Iran. At the 2006 census, its population was 151, in 37 families.

References 

Populated places in Sari County